1293 Sonja, provisional designation , is a stony asteroid and bright Mars-crosser from the innermost regions of the asteroid belt, approximately 7 kilometers in diameter. It was discovered on 26 September 1933, by Belgian astronomer Eugène Delporte at Uccle Observatory in Belgium. Two nights later, Sonja was independently discovered by Soviet astronomer Grigory Neujmin at Simeiz on the Crimean peninsula. The origin of the asteroid's name is unknown.

Orbit and classification 
 
In the SMASS taxonomy, Sonja is classified as a Sq-type, an intermediary between the abundant S and rather rare Q-type asteroids. It orbits the Sun in the inner main-belt at a distance of 1.6–2.8 AU once every 3 years and 4 months (1,214 days). Its orbit has an eccentricity of 0.28 and an inclination of 5° with respect to the ecliptic. Sonjas observation arc begins with its official discovery observation at Uccle, as no precoveries were taken and no prior identifications were made.

Physical characteristics

Rotation period 

Several well-defined rotational lightcurves of Sonja were obtained from photometric observations during 2003–2016. Light-curve analysis gave a concurring rotation period of 2.876–2.879 hours with a brightness variation between 0.14 and 0.21 magnitude.

In 2006, the first lightcurve was obtained by David Higgins, followed by Federico Manzini and Vladimir Benishek. Photometric observations continued in August 2008, by Petr Pravec at Ondřejov Observatory, and in 2016, four more lightcurves were obtained by Peter Kušnirák and Petr Pravec, as well as by Robert Stephens, Daniel Klinglesmith and Isaac Aznar.

Diameter and albedo 

According to the surveys carried out by the Japanese Akari satellite and the Infrared Astronomical Satellite IRAS, Sonja measures 3.65 and 7.80 kilometers in diameter, and its surface has an exceptionally high albedo of 0.53 and 0.46, respectively. This would make Sonja one of the brightest known Mars-crossing asteroids. However, the Collaborative Asteroid Lightcurve Link derives an albedo of 0.1226 and a diameter of 7.23 kilometers with an absolute magnitude of 13.6.

Naming 

It is unknown as to whether the name "Sonja" refers to any known place, person or occurrence. It was speculated that "Sonja" could have been chosen based on the two letter of its provisional designation, . It is also speculated, that the name "Sonja" might have been on a list of generic German female names sent by the German ARI to several discoverers of minor planets in 1913, requesting the immediate naming of their discoveries in order to avoid confusion and possible errors.

Unknown meaning 

Among the many thousands of named minor planets, Sonja is one of 120 asteroids, for which no official naming citation has been published.

Notes

References

External links 
 Astronomia Para Todos, Observatorio Isaac Aznar, Asteroids lightcurves
 Asteroid Lightcurve Database (LCDB), query form (info )
 Dictionary of Minor Planet Names, Google books
 Asteroids and comets rotation curves, CdR – Observatoire de Genève, Raoul Behrend
 Discovery Circumstances: Numbered Minor Planets (1)-(5000) – Minor Planet Center
 
 

 

001293
Discoveries by Eugène Joseph Delporte
Named minor planets
001293
19330926